Stay in Love (full title: Stay in Love: A Romantic Fantasy Set to Music) is the fourth studio album by American singer Minnie Riperton, released under Epic Records. The album features the hits "Young Willing and Able" and the Stevie Wonder collaboration "Stick Together". Unlike her previous works, the soft soul elements here tend to fade, replaced by a more upbeat disco sound which was the musical trend at the time. "Stick Together"  peaked at no. 23 on Billboard's Hot Dance Play, an alternate version known as "Stick Together (Part One)" reached no. 57 on the U.S. Hot Black Singles chart.

Stay in Love was Riperton's first disco effort and the only of her releases predominantly in the genre. It was also her last album for Epic Records; she subsequently signed to Capitol Records (which she recorded two albums during her lifetime).  Moreover, this was Ripperton's first album since her debut, Come to My Garden, that didn't feature her husband Richard Rudolph as a producer or co-producer, although Rudolph still co-wrote the songs. In his place as producer was Motown veteran Freddie Perren in his only collaboration with Ripperton.

Track listing
All tracks written by Minnie Riperton and Richard Rudolph, unless otherwise noted.

Personnel
Minnie Riperton - vocals, backing vocals
Don Peake - string and horn arrangements
Odell Brown - string arrangements on "Can You Feel What I'm Saying?" and "Stay in Love"
Wade Marcus - string and horn arrangements on "Gettin' Ready for Your Love" and "Wouldn't Matter Where You Are"
Sonny Burke, John Barnes - keyboards
Dick Rudolph, Tommy Tedesco - acoustic guitar
Bob "Boogie" Bowles, Marlo Henderson - guitar
Scott Edwards, Wilton Felder, Chuck Rainey - bass
James Gadson - drums
Paulinho da Costa, Bob Zimmitti, Joe Clayton - percussion
Plas Johnson - flute on "Gettin' Ready for Your Love"
Billy Ford, Carolyn Dennis, Carolyn Majors Caston, Jim Gilstrap, John Lehman - backing vocals
Pam Grier, Vicki Alley, Minnie Riperton, The Pastells - finger snaps on "Stick Together"
Technical
Larry Miles - recording and remixing engineer
Freddie Perren - rhythm arrangements, production
Irving Azoff - director
Kosh - design
David Alexander - photography
 Kevin Gray - mastering
Production credits taken from album liner notes.

Charts

Singles

References

1977 albums
Epic Records albums
Minnie Riperton albums
Albums arranged by Wade Marcus
Albums produced by Freddie Perren
Albums recorded at United Western Recorders
Albums recorded at Total Experience Recording Studios
Disco albums by American artists